Frank D. Laughlin (May 19, 1899 – March 10, 1984) served in the California State Assembly for the 55th district from 1935 to 1939 and during World War I he served in the United States Army.

References

United States Army personnel of World War I
Democratic Party members of the California State Assembly
20th-century American politicians
1899 births
1984 deaths